Nicolas Le Nen is a French Army officer. Since 2007, he has commanded the 27ème bataillon de chasseurs alpins, and heads the Groupement tactique interarmes de Kapisa.

Biography
Le Nen joined Saint-Cyr in 1986, and chose Infantry after graduation. After a year at the École d'application de l'infanterie, he joined the 27ème bataillon de chasseurs alpins in Annecy, and later in Perpignan as a unit commander.

Rising to lieutenant-colonel, he served at the Army headquarter under General Yves Crene from 1999 to 2002, under general Bernard Thorette from 2002 to 2006, and under general Bruno Cuche from 2006 to 2007

On 31 August 2007, Le Nen was promoted to colonel and took command of the 27 BCA, for two years.

Le Nen has also headed the groupement tactique interarmes de Kapisa from December 2008 to June 2009. He notably commanded during the Battle of Alasay, after which he was awarded the U.S. Bronze Star.

After post on classic infantry, Le Nen enters the DGSE (French foreign intelligence agency), in the clandestine action branch ("Service Action") in 1996.

- DGSE/CPIS : Unit commander (1996-1999)

- DGSE : Commanding officer of the Action Division (2014-2018)

- CPCO : commanding officer (since 2020)

Honours
  Officer of the Légion d’honneur
  Croix de la Valeur Militaire
  Croix du combattant
  Overseas Medal
  Médaille de la Défense nationale bronze
  Médaille de reconnaissance de la Nation (d’Afrique du Nord)
  Médaille commémorative française
  Bronze Star Medal

Works
 Hervé de Courrèges, Pierre-Joseph Givre and Nicolas Le Nen (preface by Henri Bentégeat), Guerre en montagne : renouveau tactique, Économica, Paris, 2006, 
 Nicolas Le Nen (ill. Yvon Ristori), Notre panache, École spéciale militaire de Saint-Cyr, Coëtquidan, 1989,

Notes and references 

1966 births
French Army officers
French military personnel of the War in Afghanistan (2001–2021)
École Spéciale Militaire de Saint-Cyr alumni
Living people
Chevaliers of the Légion d'honneur
Recipients of the Cross for Military Valour